In Hittite mythology, a huwasi stone is sacred to a deity and is usually situated in a temple.

Larger huwasi stones were placed in an open area surrounded by trees and other plants. The stones were treated as gods and were given food and water and anointed and washed.

At any cult centre, the deities that could not be given a temple were worshipped at huwasi stones. The term huwasi was used to describe the housing of the sacred stela, the huwasi stone.

References 

Hittite mythology
Ancient Near East steles